Argocoffeopsis is a genus of flowering plants in the family Rubiaceae. It is found in tropical Africa. They are lianas, climbing by means of horizontal or recurved lateral branches, or sometimes shrubs. Their papery bark is grey or brown and peeling off.

Species

 Argocoffeopsis afzelii (Hiern) Robbr.
 Argocoffeopsis eketensis (Wernham) Robbr.
 Argocoffeopsis kivuensis Robbr.
 Argocoffeopsis lemblinii (A.Chev.) Robbr.
 Argocoffeopsis pulchella (K.Schum.) Robbr.
 Argocoffeopsis rupestris (Hiern) Robbr.
 Argocoffeopsis scandens (K.Schum.) Robbr.
 Argocoffeopsis subcordata (Hiern) Lebrun

References

Rubiaceae genera
Coffeeae